Eugoa hampsoni is a moth of the family Erebidae first described by Jeremy Daniel Holloway in 2001. It is found on Borneo.

References

Moths described in 2001
hampsoni